Annie Minerva Turnbo Malone (August 9, 1879 – May 10, 1957) was an American businesswoman, inventor and philanthropist. She is considered to be one of the first African American women to become a millionaire. In the first three decades of the 20th century, she founded and developed a large and prominent commercial and educational enterprise centered on cosmetics for African-American women.

Early life 
Annie Minerva Turnbo was born in Metropolis, Illinois, the daughter of Robert and Isabella Turnbo, who had formerly been enslaved. When her father went off to fight for the Union with the 1st Kentucky Cavalry in the Civil War, Isabella took the couple's children and escaped from Kentucky, a neutral border state that maintained slavery. After traveling down the Ohio River, she found refuge in Metropolis, Illinois. Annie Turnbo was born on a farm near Metropolis in Massac County, Illinois., the tenth of eleven children.

Orphaned at a young age, she attended a public school in Metropolis, before moving in 1896 to live with her older sister Ada Moody in Peoria.  There Turnbo attended high school, taking a particular interest in chemistry. However, due to frequent illness, she was forced to withdraw from classes.

While out of school, Turnbo grew so fascinated with hair and hair care that she often practiced hairdressing with her sister. With expertise in both chemistry and hair care, Turnbo began to develop her own hair-care products. At the time, many women used goose fat, heavy oils, soap, or bacon grease to straighten their curls, which damaged both scalp and hair.

Career 
By the beginning of the 1900s, Turnbo moved with her older siblings to Lovejoy, now known as Brooklyn, Illinois. While experimenting with hair and different hair-care products, she developed and manufactured her own line of non-damaging hair straighteners, special oils, and hair-stimulant products for African-American women. She named her new product “Wonderful Hair Grower”. To promote her new product, Turnbo sold the Wonderful Hair Grower in bottles door-to-door. Her products and sales began to revolutionize hair-care methods for all African Americans.

In 1902, Turnbo moved to a thriving St. Louis, where she and three employees sold her hair-care products door-to-door. As part of her marketing, she gave away free treatments to attract more customers.

Due to the high demand for her product in St. Louis, Turnbo opened her first shop in 1902 at 2223 Market Street. She also launched a wide advertising campaign in the black press, held news conferences, toured many southern states, and recruited many women whom she trained to sell her products.

One of her selling agents, Sarah Breedlove Davis, later known as Madam C. J. Walker, operated first in St. Louis and later in Denver, Colorado until a disagreement led Walker to leave the company. Walker allegedly took the original Poro formula and created her own brand of it (this is disputed). This development was one of the reasons which led then Turnbo to copyright her products under the name "Poro" because of what she called fraudulent imitations and to discourage counterfeit versions. Poro may have received this name from a Mende word for devotional society or it may be a combination of the married names of Annie Pope and her sister Laura Roberts. Due to the growth in her business, in 1910 Turnbo moved to a larger facility on 3100 Pine Street.

Poro College
In 1918, she established Poro College, a cosmetology school and center. The building included a manufacturing plant, a retail store where Poro products were sold, business offices, a 500-seat auditorium, dining and meeting rooms, a roof garden, dormitory, gymnasium, bakery, and chapel. It served the African-American community as a center for religious and social functions.

The college's curriculum addressed the whole student; students were coached on personal style for work: on walking, talking, and a style of dress designed to maintain a solid persona. Poro College employed nearly 200 people in St. Louis. Through its school and franchise businesses, the college created jobs for almost 75,000 women in North and South America, Africa and the Philippines.

Her business thrived until 1927 when her husband filed for divorce. Having served as president of the company, he demanded half of the business' value, based on his claim that his contributions had been integral to its success. The divorce suit forced Poro College into court-ordered receivership. With support from her employees and powerful figures such as Mary McLeod Bethune, she negotiated a settlement of $200,000. This affirmed her as the sole owner of Poro College, and the divorce was granted.

After the divorce, Turnbo moved most of her business to Chicago's South Parkway, where she bought an entire city block. Other lawsuits followed. In 1937, during the Great Depression, a former employee filed suit, also claiming credit for Poro's success. To raise money for the settlement, Turnbo Malone sold her St. Louis property. Although much reduced in size, her business continued to thrive.

Philanthropy and personal life 
In 1902 she married Nelson Pope; the couple divorced in 1907.

On April 28, 1914, Annie Turnbo married Aaron Eugene Malone, a former teacher and religious book salesman.

By the 1920s, Annie Turnbo Malone had become a multi-millionaire. In 1924 she paid income tax of nearly $40,000, reportedly the highest in Missouri. While extremely wealthy, Malone lived modestly, giving thousands of dollars to the local black YMCA and the Howard University College of Medicine in Washington, DC.

She became a benefactor of the St. Louis Colored Orphans Home, where she served as president on the board of directors from 1919 to 1943. With her help, in 1922 the Home bought a facility at 2612 Goode Avenue, which was renamed Annie Malone Drive in her honor.

The Orphans Home is located in the historic Ville neighborhood. Upgraded and expanded, the facility was renamed in the entrepreneur's honor as the Annie Malone Children and Family Service Center. As well as funding many programs, Turnbo Malone ensured that her employees, all African American, were paid well and given opportunities for advancement.

Death and legacy 
Turnbo was named an honorary member of the Zeta Phi Beta sorority and was awarded an honorary degree from Howard University.

On May 10, 1957, Annie Turnbo suffered a stroke and died at Chicago's Provident Hospital. Childless, she had bequeathed her business and remaining fortune to her nieces and nephews. At the time of her death, her estate was valued at $100,000.

St. Louis has an annual Annie Malone parade in support of children's charities.

In media 
A fictionalized version of Malone is portrayed by British actress Carmen Ejogo in the 2020 Netflix miniseries Self Made. In this version, the character is renamed Addie Munroe.

Turnbo is featured in Bayer Mack's 2019 documentary, No Lye: An American Beauty Story, that chronicles the rise and decline of the black-owned ethnic beauty industry.

References

Further reading

External links
 "Annie Malone", Living St. Louis Story, KETC-9.
 Annie Malone Children & Family Service Center
 
Annie Turnbo Malone at Find a Grave

1869 births
1957 deaths
African-American inventors
American women chief executives
American cosmetics businesspeople
American chief executives of fashion industry companies
Philanthropists from New York (state)
Businesspeople from Chicago
Businesspeople from New York City
People from Brooklyn, Illinois
People from Metropolis, Illinois
People from Peoria, Illinois
Businesspeople from St. Louis
20th-century American inventors
African-American businesspeople
Women inventors
20th-century American businesspeople
20th-century American businesswomen
Philanthropists from Illinois
Burials at Burr Oak Cemetery